Early growth response protein 3 is a protein in humans, encoded by the EGR3 gene.

The gene encodes a transcriptional regulator that belongs to the EGR family of C2H2-type zinc-finger proteins. It is an immediate-early growth response gene which is induced by mitogenic  stimulation. The protein encoded by this gene participates in the transcriptional regulation of genes in controlling biological rhythm. It may also play a role in muscle development.

References

Further reading

External links 
 

Transcription factors